National Lampoon Presents Dorm Daze is a 2003 American romantic crime mystery comedy film directed by David and Scott Hillenbrand and written by Patrick Casey and Worm Miller. The film showcases many new and largely then-unknown actors and actresses. In addition to Tatyana Ali, the film also features Patrick Renna, Chris Owen, Marie-Noelle Marquis, Danielle Fishel, and Cameron Richardson.

Plot
As Christmas break approaches, the dormitories at Billingsley University are restless with sex-crazed students. Although eager to relinquish his burdensome virginity, Booker has thus far failed in this endeavor. His charitable older brother, Styles, does the sensible thing and hires a prostitute to usher Booker into the realm of manhood. However, some misunderstandings complicate this procedure, prompting sophomoric shenanigans.

Cast

Production
The film was shot on location in California. The three major locations in California used for filming were: Los Angeles, San Diego (including Balboa Park), and Castaic.

Release

Box office
Dorm Daze opened in a limited release on September 26, 2003 and earned $27,712 in its opening weekend, ranking number 66 in the domestic box office. At the end of its run, closing on October 17, the film had grossed $56,127. Overseas, in Russia, the film fared slightly better, earning $380,238. Worldwide, the film grossed $436,365.

Critical reception
On Rotten Tomatoes the film holds a 0% rating based on reviews from 7 critics.

Dorm Daze has developed a following of adolescent teenagers in the years since its release. In response, an unrated version was eventually released.

Home media
The film was released on DVD August 10, 2004 and debuted at number twelve on the DVD rental charts bringing in 2.13 million dollars its first week.

Sequel
A sequel entitled National Lampoon's Dorm Daze 2: College @ Sea was released on DVD September 5, 2006. Several of the principal actors returned for the sequel including Danielle Fishel and Chris Owen.

A second sequel was produced, but was reworked to be a standalone film before being released as Transylmania on December 4, 2009.

References

External links
 
 

Dorm Daze
2003 films
2000s crime comedy films
2003 LGBT-related films
2000s mystery films
2003 romantic comedy films
2000s teen comedy films
American crime comedy films
American independent films
American LGBT-related films
American mystery films
American romantic comedy films
American teen comedy films
2000s English-language films
Films shot in California
Films shot in Los Angeles
Lesbian-related films
Films with screenplays by Patrick Casey (writer)
Films with screenplays by Josh Miller (filmmaker)
Romantic crime films
2000s American films